John Anton Yngve (October 4, 1924 – May 21, 2019) was an American lawyer and politician.

Early life and education
Yngve was born in Thief River Falls, Minnesota. He graduated from the St. Louis Park High School in St. Louis Park, Minnesota. He received his law degree from University of Minnesota in 1949.

Career 
Yngve served in the United States Army Air Forces during World War II. After graduating from law school, he established a legal practice in Plymouth, Minnesota. Yngve served on the Plymouth City Council and on the Plymouth Planning Commission from 1959 to 1962. He served in the Minnesota House of Representatives from 1963 to 1968 as a Republican. He served on the University of Minnesota Board of Regents from 1969 to 1975.

Personal life 
Yngve died in Golden Valley, Minnesota in 2019.

References

External links

1924 births
2019 deaths
People from Thief River Falls, Minnesota
People from Plymouth, Minnesota
Military personnel from Minnesota
United States Army Air Forces soldiers
University of Minnesota Law School alumni
Minnesota lawyers
Minnesota city council members
Republican Party members of the Minnesota House of Representatives
20th-century American lawyers
People from Golden Valley, Minnesota